William Rudolf "Bill" Muehlberger (September 26, 1923 – September 14, 2011), Professor of Geology at University of Texas at Austin, was the geology principal investigator of both the Apollo 16 and 17 missions to the Moon, for National Aeronautics and Space Administration (NASA). He died of natural causes on September 14, 2011.

The Apollo 16 Moon rock Big Muley is named after Muehlberger.

See also
Capulin Volcano National Monument
Kilauea
Lunar Crater National Natural Landmark
Mono-Inyo Craters
Rio Grande Gorge
Stillwater igneous complex
Sudbury Basin

References

External links 
 1999 Interview by Carol Butler

1923 births
American geologists
California Institute of Technology alumni
2011 deaths
NASA people
University of Texas at Austin faculty